Aberdeen South was a constituency of the Scottish Parliament (Holyrood). It elected one Member of the Scottish Parliament (MSP) by the first past the post method of election. Also, however, it was one of nine constituencies in the North East Scotland electoral region, which elected seven additional members, in addition to nine constituency MSPs, to produce a form of proportional representation for the region as a whole.

For the Scottish Parliament election, 2011, Aberdeen South was expanded into Aberdeenshire for the newly created constituency of Aberdeen South and North Kincardine

Electoral region

The other eight constituencies of the North East Scotland region were; Aberdeen Central, Aberdeen North, Angus, Banff and Buchan, Dundee East, Dundee West, Gordon  and West Aberdeenshire and Kincardine

The region covers the Aberdeenshire council area, the Aberdeen City council area, the Dundee City council area, part of the Angus council area, a small part of the Moray council area and a small part of the Perth and Kinross council area.

Constituency boundaries
The Aberdeen South constituency was created at the same time as the Scottish Parliament, in 1999, with the name and boundaries of an  existing Westminster constituency. In 2005, however, the boundaries of the Westminster (House of Commons) constituency were subject to some alteration.

Council area
The Holyrood constituency was within the Aberdeen City council area, which was divided between three North East Scotland constituencies: Aberdeen South, Aberdeen Central and Aberdeen North.
All three were entirely within the city area.

Boundary review

Following their First Periodic review of parliamentary constituencies to the Scottish Parliament, the  Boundary Commission for Scotland has created three newly shaped seats for the Aberdeen City council area. These seats, which were formed in time for the elections in 2011, were Aberdeen Central, Aberdeen Donside, and Aberdeen South and North Kincardine.

Member of the Scottish Parliament

Election results

 
 
 

 
 
 
 
 

 

 
 
 
 

 

Scottish Parliament constituencies and regions 1999–2011
Politics of Aberdeen
1999 establishments in Scotland
Constituencies established in 1999
2011 disestablishments in Scotland
Constituencies disestablished in 2011